Distance and Time is the third album of original studio material from British musician Fink. It was released on 1 October 2007 on the Ninja Tune independent record label.

The track "Make It Good" is a variation on a song that Fink appeared in, "If You Stayed Over", which was released on the album Days to Come by British musician Bonobo.

Track listing
 "Trouble's What You're In" - 4:27
 "This Is the Thing" - 4:33
 "If Only" - 4:22
 "Blueberry Pancakes" - 4:22
 "Get Your Share" - 3:18
 "Under the Same Stars" - 4:10
 "So Many Roads" - 4:04
 "Make It Good" - 3:37
 "Little Blue Mailbox" - 4:10

References

External links

2007 albums
Fink (singer) albums